Hugo Sánchez is the name of:

 Hugo Sánchez Bonilla (born 1940), Costa Rican artist
 Hugo Sánchez Guerrero (born 1981), Mexican football player
 Hugo Sánchez Márquez (born 1958), Mexican football player
 Hugo Sánchez Portugal (1984–2014), sports commentator (son of Hugo Sánchez Márquez)
 Hugo Sánchez Flores in 2014 Copa de España de Futsal